Edgar González Franco (born 3 July 1980 in Toluca) is a Mexican former footballer who most recently played as a striker for Potros UAEM.

Career
González made his debut with Club Toluca in the Apertura 2002 tournament against Necaxa. He made a total of 42 Primera appearances for Toluca before moving to Club América for the Apertura 2004. However, he only made two league appearances at America and he returned to Toluca for the Apertura 2006, making a further 36 appearances for them up to the end of the Clausura 2008.

After leaving Toluca he played for Club Tijuana (2008–09), C.F. La Piedad (2009–10), Estudiantes de Altamira (2010–11) and Club Universidad de Guadalajara, in the Liga de Ascenso.

References

1980 births
Living people
People from Toluca
Footballers from the State of Mexico
Deportivo Toluca F.C. players
Club América footballers
Club Tijuana footballers
Leones Negros UdeG footballers
Association football forwards
Mexican footballers